Pekw'Xe:yles or Peckquaylis  is an Indian reserve on the north bank of the Fraser River in Mission, British Columbia, Canada, located between Lower Hatzic Slough and D'Herbomez Creek.  It sits on the former site of St. Mary's Indian Residential School.  10.3 ha. in area, it was reinstated in June, 2005 by Order in Council and is used by 21 Indian bands.

See also
St. Mary's Indian Residential School
Fraser Valley Heritage Park
Grotto of Our Lady of Lourdes

References

Indian reserves in the Lower Mainland
Mission, British Columbia
Sto:lo